Fishcam refers to a broadcast consisting of a video camera pointed at a fish tank.

Australia 
Channel 31 Melbourne, Australia, had one of the more famous and long-lasting fishcams. The Fishcam itself was originally used as a replacement to the more common testcards, shown when the station had nothing else to air. Due to extreme popularity though, the FishCam became an actual scheduled show on the network. The station has also released several VHS tapes of the programme. The broadcast was accompanied by the music of unsigned Melbourne musicians.

Rumours have abounded amongst fans that Channel 31 has played repeats of this programme while it has continued to be labelled "live".
  
From 4 March 2007 the broadcasting of FishCam on Channel 31 has ceased.

On 13 October 2014 FishCam returned at the new time of 9pm hosted by Luis from Lessons with Luis. It ran for 11 episodes, ending on 22 December 2014, when the fish tank was broken during the final episode.

Canada
When St. John's television station NTV first commenced 24-hour broadcasting in the early-1970s, one of its overnight programmes was a continuous shot of a fish tank.

Denmark
Between 1981 and 1985, the public Danish broadcaster Danmarks Radio (DR) aired a programme called pausefisk (pause fish) during long breaks between programming.

Germany
In 1992 when Ostdeutscher Rundfunk Brandenburg launched, ORB Aquarium was among the original programmes, consisting of a 30-minute loop of Fish. Music was provided by Radio Brandenburg (now rbb radioeins). In September 1992, the show recurved 10,000 viewers and a 37.5% market share, the highest value in the history of ORB. That led to similar programmes such as Space Night, first shown on Bayerischer Rundfunk in 1994, which is currently shown on ARD-alpha & Germany's Most Beautiful Railways aired on ARD between 1995 & 2013. ORB Aquarium was discontinued in 2004.

Hong Kong
The ATV Network in Hong Kong also aired a Fishcam programme, in lieu of test card after the station signs off the air. The programme's name was Telefishion. It became an unexpected hit for the station, with the programme performing as well as, if not better than, the station's normal primetime programmes. The title of the show entered into popular vocabulary as one being incredibly bored.

Norway
The Norwegian public broadcaster NRK first aired a Fishcam-style programme called pausefiskene (pause-fishes) in black-and-white in 1965, converting to colour in the 1970s.

Turkey
Turkish broadcaster Digiturk broadcasts live fish tanks on their music channels under the name "Aquavision".

Turkmenistan 
The state run youth channel Yaşlyk broadcasts a digital fish tank with the same piece of classical music playing on a loop after ending their daily transmissions until 6:55am.

Netscape 
Netscape has a web feed of their fish tank, and for some time had an easter egg hidden in Netscape Communicator that would bring that page up when a user pressed CTRL + ALT + F. The Netscape Fishcam was the 2nd live camera to start broadcasting on the Web. The Netscape Fishcam went off line in the Summer of 2007 and has been moved to a new site with a new tank housed in the offices of Zetta, Inc. by its original creator, Lou Montulli. The Fishcam easter egg was present in Mozilla Firefox until 15 February 2009 and remains in SeaMonkey.

Similar events
Yule Log, which broadcast on WPIX on Christmas night
Orchestra (unofficial name), which broadcast on TV11 Thailand during downtime

See also
Yule Log (TV program)
Lavarand

References

External links
 Fishycam.com. Two fish tanks streaming live, with a "time machine" feature to watch recordings if it's night time.
 The Amazing Fishcam!  by its original creator, Lou Montulli
 -=TankedCam=-  Interactive FishCam
 FishCam Trap - Webcams + Interactive Trap = Catch Fish!
 Interactive Office FishCam
 Interactive 29 Gallon Aquarium - FishCamLive.com

Slow television
Television in Australia
Interstitial television shows